Jure Franko (born 28 March 1962 in Nova Gorica) is a Slovenian-Yugoslav former alpine skier, best known for winning a giant slalom silver medal at the 1984 Winter Olympics in Sarajevo.

Jure Franko was born and raised in Nova Gorica, a city in Slovenia at the border with Italy. Franko competed in giant slalom and super giant slalom events, and reached the peak of his skiing career in the 1983–84 season. On 14 February 1984, at the 1984 Winter Olympics in Sarajevo, he won a silver medal in giant slalom. This was the first Winter Olympics medal ever for Yugoslavia. Franko was at the 4th position after the first leg of the giant slalom, and delivered the fastest time of the second leg, bringing him to second place overall (Max Julen from Switzerland took gold).

Franko also competed in the World Cup competitions, where he placed himself 3rd three times. In addition, he achieved 23 top ten positions, and 11 additional top 15 positions. He quit skiing after the 1984–85 season.

In January 2006, Jure Franko participated in the 2006 Winter Olympic torch relay, by relaying the torch from Slovenia to Italy at the Slovenian-Italian border in Nova Gorica. He also organised a trip for 43 children of modest economic backgrounds from Sarajevo, Nova Gorica and Gorizia to visit the giant slalom event at the 2006 Winter Olympic games in Turin, Italy.

He is the "Honorary Citizen of Sarajevo", an honor bestowed upon Slovenian skier by the City Council of Sarajevo at the session held on 30 September 2020.

Jure is sometimes confused with Jurij Franko, designer of the Elan SCX ski. The two attended the same school during the 1970s.

World Cup results

Season standings

Race podiums

Olympic Games results

World Championships results

References

External links
IOC Athletes

1962 births
Living people
Slovenian male alpine skiers
Alpine skiers at the 1980 Winter Olympics
Alpine skiers at the 1984 Winter Olympics
People from Nova Gorica
Olympic medalists in alpine skiing
Medalists at the 1984 Winter Olympics
Olympic alpine skiers of Yugoslavia
Olympic silver medalists for Yugoslavia
Universiade medalists in alpine skiing
Universiade gold medalists for Yugoslavia
Competitors at the 1985 Winter Universiade